Edward Joseph Messbarger (July 26, 1932 – June 30, 2014) was an American college basketball coach.  Messbarger amassed over 600 wins as head coach at Benedictine Heights College in Tulsa Oklahoma, the University of Dallas, Saint Mary's University, Texas and Angelo State University.

Messbarger coached at St. Mary's University from 1963 to 1978, coaching the Rattlers to four NAIA tournaments (in 1964, 1967, 1974 and 1975) and produced the future NBA player Robert Reid. Moving to Angelo State, Messbarger won 267 games in twenty seasons with the Rams. He led the program to two Lone Star Conference titles and was twice named conference coach of the year before retiring in 1998.

Messbarger died in his home in San Angelo, Texas, on June 30, 2014.

Head Coaching Record

References

1932 births
2014 deaths
American men's basketball coaches
Angelo State Rams men's basketball coaches
College men's basketball head coaches in the United States
Dallas Crusaders men's basketball coaches
Northwest Missouri State Bearcats football players
People from San Angelo, Texas
St. Mary's Rattlers men's basketball coaches